Dorset Innovation Park (formerly Dorset Green Technology Park, and earlier known as Winfrith Technology Centre) is a science and technology park which is owned by the Homes and Communities Agency. The site was the former UKAEA Winfrith Atomic Energy Establishment which was in service from the 1950s to early 1990s. The Steam Generating Heavy Water Reactor was also developed at the site.

The centre is situated near the village of Winfrith Newburgh, which is some eight miles west of Wareham and nine miles east of Dorchester.

History

Winfrith Technology Centre
Winfrith Technology Centre dates from the 1980s when part of the UKAEA site was already being referred to by that name. It was used as a research and development centre in support of the nuclear, oil and gas industries.

By the early 21st century, under the ownership of UKAEA, the centre was home to about 50 companies including defence technology company QinetiQ which operated its underwater technology business there. QinetiQ would later sell its underwater technology  division to Atlas Elektronik in 2009, whilst still remaining a tenant at Winfrith.

In 2004 Winfrith Technology Centre was sold to the UK government's regeneration agency, English Partnerships for £7.54 million. English Partnerships' ownership passed to its successor body, the Homes and Communities Agency, in December 2008.

Dorset Green Technology Park
In early 2008 English Partnerships appointed Zog Brownfield Ventures to redevelop the Technology Centre. The intention was "to create an eco-friendly business complex". By 2009 the site was being called the Dorset Green Technology Park. There were major plans to expand and redevelop the site.

Dorset Innovation Park
In 2018 the site was relaunched as the Dorset Innovation Park. The launch coincided with "the completion of 20 new employment units".  As Dorset's only economic development site with Enterprise Zone status, Dorset Council promoted the site as an advanced engineering cluster of excellence for the South West, building on its strengths in marine, defence, energy and cyber-security.

References

External links
Dorset Innovation Park, Enterprise Zones, HM Government
Dorset Innovation Park, Dorset Local Enterprise Partnership
Dorset Green Technology Park, 2014 snapshot at the Internet Archive

Science and technology in Dorset
Science parks in the United Kingdom
Business parks of England